The IECEE is the IEC System of Conformity Assessment Schemes for Electrotechnical Equipment and Components being a body of the International Electrotechnical Commission (IEC). The IEC uses the name IECEE for the IEC System for Conformity Testing and Certification of Electrotechnical Equipment and Components that is better known as the CB System

The predecessor of IECEE was a European body founded under the name of Commission internationale de réglementation en vue de l'approbation de l'équipement électrique (International commission on rules for the approval of electrical equipment) known as CEE.  Historically this certification process goes back to 1929 based on an initiative by the German VDE (Verband der Elektrotechnik, Elektronik und Informationstechnik).

CEE also devised and published standards for electrical equipment, most of which have been superseded by IEC standards.

CB Scheme 

The IEC CB Scheme is multilateral agreement to allow international certification of electrical and electronic products so that a single certification allows worldwide market access.

The CB scheme has its origin in the European "Commission for Conformity Testing of Electrical Equipment" (CEE) which merged into the IEC in 1985. CB system is the abbreviation for the name of the meaning of "Certification Bodies' Scheme" i.e, "system certification body.". As of July 1992, CB system had a total of 30 member countries namely Austria, Australia, Belgium, Canada, Switzerland, China, former Czechoslovakia, Germany, Denmark, Spain, Finland, France, Britain, Greece, Hungary, Ireland, Israel, India, Iceland, Italy, Japan, South Korea , the Netherlands, Norway, Poland, Sweden, Singapore, the former Soviet Union, former Yugoslavia, the United States. Currently there are some 52 member bodies organized in the IECEE and a further 65 NCBs (national certification bodies) support the scheme with 276 CB test labs (CBTL). A product being certified in a certified testing laboratory according to the harmonized standard will receive a CB Report that may be submitted to the national certification bodies like GS, PSE, CCC, NOM, GOST/R, BSMI.

CEE standards 
 
CEE published a number of standards under its own name.  Most of these have been superseded by CENELEC and/or IEC standards.

See also 
 Industrial and multiphase power plugs and sockets
 Perilex, superseded by the IEC 60309
 International Electrotechnical Commission (IEC)

References

External links 
 IECEE website

Electrical safety standards organizations
Mains power connectors